Nyctibatrachus sabarimalai, the Sabarimala night frog, is a small sized miniature frog (12.3 mm). It was found in close vicinity of the Sabarimala Pilgrimage centre in the Western Ghats, Southern India.

Distribution and taxonomy 
The species specific name "sabarimalai" is based on the place from where it has been collected. Genus Nyctibatrachus is reported to be found in Western Ghats.

References 

Nyctibatrachidae